The 1912 County Championship was the twenty-third officially organised running of the County Championship. Yorkshire County Cricket Club won their ninth championship title.

A No Result (NR) column was introduced for the first time which included all matches in which no decision was reached on first innings: these games were not used when calculating maximum possible points. Five matches were abandoned without a ball being bowled and were included in the NR column.

Table
 Five points were awarded for a win.
 Three points were awarded for "winning" the first innings of a drawn match.
 One point was awarded for "losing" the first innings of a drawn match.
 Final placings were decided by calculating the percentage of * possible points.
 Final placings were decided by calculating the percentage of possible points.

References

1912 in English cricket
County Championship seasons
County